"So Good" is a song by American singer-songwriter Halsey. It was released as a single through Capitol Records on June 9, 2022. The song was written by Halsey, Sarah Aarons and Sammy Witte. It was produced by Tobias Karlsson with additional production by Witte and Max Martin. Two days after the song was released, Halsey performed it live for the first time at the 2022 Governors Ball Music Festival.

Composition and lyrics
"So Good" is a pop ballad about Halsey's long-term relationship with Turkish-American screenwriter Alev Aydin, who directed the song's music video and appears in it with Halsey.

Release controversy
On May 22 and 23, 2022, Halsey took to Twitter and TikTok, claiming her record label, Capitol Records, was holding up the release of "So Good", which, along with its music video, had been completed for over a month. She further felt that they were holding up releases of other artists as well due to being careful because of marketing. Revealed to be titled "So Good", Halsey revealed that her label was refusing to release the song as they wanted to "test its virality on TikTok" first. The controversy surrounding its release led to much criticism of Capitol; eventually, on May 31, 2022, Capitol announced they would release the song on June 9, 2022, stating on Twitter; "We are an artist-first company that encourages open dialogue".

Music video
The song's official music video, directed by Alev Aydin, premiered on June 10, 2022. Halsey and Aydin appear with Charlie Oldman, Sora Connor and Tatiana de Campos Ringsbys, in scenes showing the process of shooting a video.

Personnel
 Halsey – vocals
 Max Martin – additional production
 Tobias Karlsson – production, guitar, bass, keyboards, engineering, programming
 Samuel Witte - additional production
 Serban Ghenea – mixing
 Bryce Bordone – mixing assistance
 Chris Gehringer – mastering
 Brandon Buttner – recording

Charts

Weekly charts

Year-end charts

Certifications

References

2022 singles
2022 songs
Halsey (singer) songs
Capitol Records singles
EMI Records singles
Songs written by Halsey (singer)
Songs written by Sarah Aarons
Song recordings produced by Max Martin
Pop ballads
2020s ballads